Marie-Anne Chabin (born 17 October 1959 in Issoudun, Indre) is a French archivist and an internationally recognized Records management and Information Lifecycle Management expert.

Biography

Graduate of the École Nationale des Chartes, Chabin first gained experience as an archivist in the public sector. In 2000, she created an advisory firm for document and records management, called Archive 17. She is involved in many projects linked to ISO 15489 and MoReq standards and has published several books and articles about diplomatics and preservation of electronic records.

From 2017 to 2022, she was associate professor at the University of Paris VIII.

Select bibliography

 Je pense, donc j'archive, Paris, L'Harmattan, 1999.
 Le management de l'archive, Paris, Hermès, 2000.
 Dématérialisation et archivage électronique, Paris, Dunod, 2006 (with Jean-Marc Rietsch and Eric Caprioli).
 Archiver, et après ?, Paris, Djakarta, 2007.

References
 Chabin's personal blog
 Chabin's blog on professional issues

See also 
 List of archivists

1959 births
Living people
People from Issoudun
French archivists
Female archivists
École Nationale des Chartes alumni
University of Paris alumni